Matupi may refer to:

Matupi Township in Mindat District, Chin State, Myanmar
Matupi, Myanmar, its chief town
Matupi language or Batu, spoken by residents of the town
Matupi Harbour, New Britain
Matupi Cave, in the Democratic Republic of the Congo